Life on the Mississippi (1883) is a memoir by Mark Twain of his days as a steamboat pilot on the Mississippi River before the American Civil War. It is also a travel book, recounting his trip up the Mississippi River from New Orleans to Saint Paul many years after the war.

Overview
The book begins with a brief history of the river as reported by Europeans and Americans, beginning with the Spanish explorer Hernando de Soto in 1542. It continues with anecdotes of Twain's training as a steamboat pilot, as the 'cub' (apprentice) of an experienced pilot, Horace E. Bixby. He describes, with great affection, the science of navigating the ever-changing Mississippi River in a section that was first published in 1876, entitled "Old Times on the Mississippi". Although Twain was actually 21 when he began his training, he uses artistic license to make himself seem somewhat younger, referring to himself as a "fledgling" and a "boy" who "ran away from home" to seek his fortune on the river, and playing up his own callowness and naïveté.

In the second half, Twain narrates his trip many years later on a steamboat from St. Louis to New Orleans, shortly followed by a steamboat journey from New Orleans to St Paul (with a stop at his boyhood home town of Hannibal, MO). He describes the competition from railroads, and the new, large cities, and adds his observations on greed, gullibility, tragedy, and bad architecture. He also tells some stories that are most likely tall tales.

Publication
Simultaneously published in 1883 in the United States and Great Britain, the book is the first submitted to a publisher as a typewritten manuscript. Twain did not, however, use the typewriter himself. His secretary, Isabel V. Lyon, typed from Twain's manuscript.

Dramatic adaptations

In 1980, the book was adapted as a TV movie for American public television, with David Knell performing as Sam Clemens (Mark Twain's real name) and Robert Lansing as Horace Bixby, the steamboat pilot who mentored him. The film used many tall tales from the book, woven into a fictional narrative.  

In 2010, Life on the Mississippi was adapted as a stage musical, with book and lyrics by Douglas M. Parker and music by Denver Casado. It was produced that year in Kansas City, Missouri, and Door County, Wisconsin.

In 2013, Life on the Mississippi, a musical play by Philip Hall, was performed at the Workshop Theater Company in New York.  It was directed by Susanna Frazer.

See also
George Washington Cable
Lagniappe 
Joseph Alexander Mabry, Jr.
Mark Twain Birthplace State Historic Site
Mark Twain Boyhood Home & Museum
Mark Twain House
Mud clerk
Paddle steamer
Pennsylvania steamboat
Riverboat
Steamboat
Steamboats of the Mississippi

References

External links

 
 
 Life on the Mississippi from the University of North Carolina at Chapel Hill
 
 IMDb entry for PBS movie

1883 non-fiction books
Works about the Mississippi River
Books by Mark Twain
Non-fiction books about racism
American memoirs
Non-fiction books adapted into films